Vyšný Hrušov is a village and municipality in Humenné District in the Prešov Region of north-east Slovakia, on the southern edge of the Laborec Highlands.

History
In historical records the village was first mentioned in 1543.

Geography
The municipality lies at an altitude of 186 metres and covers an area of 11.361 km2.
It has a population of about 465 people.

References

External links
 
 

Villages and municipalities in Humenné District
Zemplín (region)